Nicolaas Douwma (born 13 April 1982), better known by his stage name Sub Focus, is an English DJ, record producer, songwriter, musician and sound engineer from Guildford, Surrey. He has been releasing records since 2003. On 12 October 2009, he released his self-titled debut album. He released his second album, Torus, on 30 September 2013. Douwma's album in collaboration with Wilkinson titled Portals was released on 9 October 2020 through Casablanca Records.

Music career

Starting out
Originally a fan of rock music, including bands such as Nirvana, Douwma started a band at school with some friends although this was a short-lived ambition as he "wasn't very good" at playing musical instruments. At the age of 13, however, he discovered computer software for producing electronic music and became a self-taught producer, and started making rudimentary dance music. The main reason he followed this path and ultimately got more involved in it was because it meant that he could successfully create a whole song on a computer without having to be able to play a musical instrument. His first major influences were groups such as The Prodigy and The Chemical Brothers, artists who blended guitars with dance music. He first discovered jungle and drum and bass music after hearing "Incredible" by M-Beat and General Levy.

Douwma did not start taking music production seriously until he left school and deciding what to do for a career. In order to advance and to get more of an understanding of electronic music production, he went to college and studied sound engineering. From 2001 to 2002 onwards, largely due to encouragement from his friends, he started sending out demo CDs. His breakthrough came in 2003 when a friend of his who was playing in a club on the same night as RAM Records boss Andy C gave him his demo CD, with his phone number written on it (he had the CD with him so he could have some exclusive tunes to play in his set). After hearing it, Andy was so impressed with the demo, he phoned up Douwma straight away and signed every track instantly, and Douwma was signed to RAM's sister label Frequency, before making his debut on RAM two years later.

2005–2008: Early career
In March 2005, Douwma had a number one single on the UK Dance Chart with "X-Ray / Scarecrow". The single reached number 60 on the UK Singles Chart. In June 2008, he hit number one on the UK Dance Chart again with "Timewarp / Join the Dots".

2006: Sub Focus
In 2006, he traveled to the U.S. and played at Five Nightclub in Washington, D.C., courtesy of Upfront Productions.

2009–2010: Sub Focus

In August 2009, he cracked the UK top 40 for the first time with "Rock It / Follow the Light", which reached number 38. "Rock It / Follow the Light" also got him a third UK Dance Chart number one, as well as reaching the B-list of BBC Radio 1's playlist. Sub Focus has also remixed selected works of The Prodigy, deadmau5, Rusko, Dr. Octagon, Empire of the Sun and Dizzee Rascal. On 6 October 2009, Sub Focus released "Smooth" which was free to download. On 12 October 2009, he released his debut studio album Sub Focus, the album peaked at number 51 on the UK Albums Chart.

2010–2019: Torus

In 2010, Sub Focus was a support act for Australian drum and bass band Pendulum on their UK tour to promote their third album Immersion. Later that year, he produced the Example track "Kickstarts" for his second album, Won't Go Quietly. The track was successful in the UK Singles Chart, peaking at number three. This makes it Sub Focus' most commercially successful production to date. A free track "Falling Down" featuring vocals from Kenzie May was released on his website and was later released digitally as an EP. In 2012, he released "Out the Blue" featuring Alice Gold and it reached number 23 in the UK Singles Chart. It was followed by "Tidal Wave" featuring Alpines which peaked at number 12 in the UK Singles Chart, which also became his first to spend at least two weeks in the top 40. "Tidal Wave" also featured on the Mercedes Benz "Sound with Power" advertising campaign, along with Tinie Tempah. On 12 May 2013, "Endorphins" featuring Alex Clare was released, continuing his recent chart success, peaking at number 10 in the UK Singles Chart. The album's fifth single "Turn It Around" was released on 22 September 2013 and reached number 14. His second studio album Torus was released on 30 September 2013. He headlined the Radio 1 Dance stage at the Reading and Leeds Festivals 2013. Sub Focus played at Glastonbury 2013 with his new live show setup. Later in the summer of 2013, he went on to play at Dour Festival, Reading & Leeds, Global Gathering, Bestival and Isle of Wight festival among others. He headlined BBC Radio 1Xtra Live at the Bournemouth International Centre on 7 October. He then completed a 2013 UK tour. The sixth single from Torus, "Turn Back Time", slowly climbed the UK Singles Chart to number 10. The next single from Torus, a new version of "Close" featuring a session singer instead of MNEK, failed to chart.

2020–present: Portals

On 15 September 2020, Douwma announced on Twitter that a collaborative album with fellow UK artist Wilkinson would be released on 9 October of that year. The album was made available for pre-order on CD and vinyl. Portals tracklist was revealed by Douwma on 17 September. It contains 11 tracks, including the four singles "Air I Breathe", "Illuminate", "Just Hold On" and "Turn the Lights Off".

Discography

 Sub Focus (2009)
 Torus (2013)
 Portals (2020) 
 Reworks I (2021)
 Evolve (2023)

References

External links

English record producers
People from Guildford
Living people
English drum and bass musicians
English DJs
Electronic dance music DJs
1982 births
21st-century English musicians
Owsla artists
RAM Records artists